Water coaster may refer to:
 Water coaster (roller coaster), a type of roller coaster
 Water coaster (water slide), a model of water slide with uphill sections